The Carnegie Public Library, also known as the Gothenburg Public Library, is a historic Carnegie library building in Gothenburg, Nebraska. It was built in 1915–1916 with a grant from the Carnegie Corporation, and designed in the Jacobethan Revival style by architect Morse N. Bair. It has been listed on the National Register of Historic Places since December 19, 1986.

References

Carnegie libraries in Nebraska
National Register of Historic Places in Dawson County, Nebraska
Jacobean architecture in the United States
Library buildings completed in 1915